Norbert Mary Leonard James Dorsey, C.P. (December 13, 1929 – February 21, 2013) was a prelate of the Roman Catholic Church.  He served as an auxiliary bishop of the Archdiocese of Miami in Florida (1986–1990) and as the third bishop of the Diocese of Orlando in Florida (1990–2004).

Biography

Early life 
Dorsey Dorsey was born in Springfield, Massachusetts, on December 13, 1929.  He made profession as a member of the clerical Congregation of the Passion on August 15, 1949, when he was 19 years old. 

On April 28, 1956, Dorsey was ordained a priest in that Congregation. In 1976, Dorsey was elected to the General Council of the Passionists worldwide, and re-elected in 1982.

Auxiliary Bishop of Miami 
Pope John Paul II appointed Dorsey as titular bishop of Mactaris and as an auxiliary bishop of the Archdiocese of Miami on January 19, 1986 He was consecrated on March 19, 1986, with Archbishop Edward McCarthy as the  principal consecrator: and as co-consecrators Bishop Joseph Maguire and Bishop Reginald Edward Vincent Arliss.

Bishop of Orlando 
On March 20, 1990, Dorsey was appointed by John Paul II as the third bishop of the Diocese of Orlando.  Dorsey resigned as bishop of Orlando on November 13, 2004, upon reaching 75 years of age.Norbert Dorsey died after a long battle with cancer in Orlando, Florida, aged 83.

Awards 

 Knight commander of the Order of the Holy Sepulchre (KCHS) for his work on behalf of Near East refugees in 1978 
 Peace and Unity Award of the St. Martin Porres Association of Miami, Florida for building bridges of harmony between races and cultures, 1989 
 Appreciation Award from the National Council of Christians and Jews, Interfaith Council of Miami 1990 
 Founding President Award of the National Council of Christians and Jews, Orlando Chapter, 1991
 Pierre Toussaint Medallion from the Office of Black Ministry of Archdiocese of New York, presented at St. Patrick's Cathedral, New York by Cardinal John O'Connor, for special merit in the service of freedom, human rights, and spiritual values in the black community on  May 5, 1996
 Appreciation Award of the Ancient Order of Hibernians (2001)

References

External links
 Diocese of Orlando bio
 The Passionists

1929 births
2013 deaths
20th-century Roman Catholic bishops in the United States
21st-century Roman Catholic bishops in the United States
Deaths from cancer in Florida
People from Springfield, Massachusetts
Roman Catholic Archdiocese of Miami
Roman Catholic bishops of Orlando
Knights of the Holy Sepulchre
Catholics from Massachusetts